The Slovenian Regional Leagues are the fourth tier leagues in the Slovenian football system. They are alternately operated by the participating clubs' Intercommunal Football Associations. The winners are promoted to the Slovenian Third League.

Regional Leagues

Current
Littoral Football League, consisting of clubs from the Slovene Littoral.
Ljubljana Regional League, consisting of clubs from Lower Carniola and Inner Carniola.
Pomurska Football League, consisting of clubs from Prekmurje. The league ceased in 2013, but was reformed in 2019.
Upper Carniolan Football League, consisting of clubs from Upper Carniola.
Ptuj Super League, consisting of clubs from the MNZ Ptuj Association.

Former
Styrian Football League, which consisted of clubs from Styria and Carinthia. The league ceased in 2014 and was replaced by the Intercommunal Leagues.

Winners

References

4
Sports leagues established in 1991
1991 establishments in Slovenia
Fourth level football leagues in Europe